Kent is an unincorporated community and census-designated place (CDP) in Republican Township, Jefferson County, Indiana, United States. As of the 2010 census it had a population of 70.

History
Kent was platted in 1853. It was named for James Kent, a New York jurist. The Kent post office was discontinued in 1965.

Geography
Indiana State Road 256 passes through the community, leading east  to Madison, the county seat, and west  to Austin.

The community sits on the east side of Little Creek, a north-flowing tributary of Big Creek, a major northwest-flowing tributary of the Muscatatuck River, which is part of the White River watershed.

Demographics

References

Census-designated places in Jefferson County, Indiana
Census-designated places in Indiana